The 1936 Naval Revolt ( lit. 1936 Sailors' Revolt) or Tagus boats mutiny (Motim dos Barcos do Tejo) was a mutiny in Portugal that occurred on 8 September 1936 aboard the aviso  and destroyer . It was organized by the Revolutionary Organization of the Fleet (Organização Revolucionária da Armada, ORA), a left-wing group with links to the Portuguese Communist Party. 

The mutiny broke out on 8 September 1936 among communist sailors in the Portuguese Navy's two newest warships moored in the estuary of the Tagus River near Lisbon. Their aim was ostensibly to take part in the Spanish Civil War alongside the Republicans by sailing to a Republican-held port in the Mediterranean. However, the revolt failed and the convicted sailors were the first to be sent to the Tarrafal concentration camp established in the Cape Verde Islands to house political prisoners.

Background 
In February 1936, a coalition of leftist groups won national elections in Spain. Conservative partisans sought refuge in Portugal, where a right-wing dictatorship, the Estado Novo, established in 1926 and led by António de Oliveira Salazar, felt threatened by the change in power in Spain. Soon thereafter Spanish conservatives led by General Francisco Franco rebelled, initiating the Spanish Civil War. The Portuguese offered support to Franco's forces in defiance of a non-intervention agreement they had been pressured to sign by their ally, the United Kingdom. The British government warned the Portuguese that they would not be protected from Spanish leftist attack if they continued to involve themselves in the war, making the regime increasingly nervous about its position.

While the Portuguese government increased its support of Franco, the Portuguese Communist Party stepped up its activism in opposition to the Estado Novo. Through the Revolutionary Organization of the Fleet (Organização Revolucionária da Armada, ORA), which had grown in strength over the course of the early 1930s, the party plotted a mutiny of several Portuguese Navy ships with intention of allowing them to sail to Spain to assist the Spanish government in the war.

Mutiny
The Portuguese fleet lay at anchor in the estuary of the Tagus River on 8 September 1936. The rebels planned to seize control of the ships present and the coastal forts. At 03:00 their ships were to begin their departure, following each other out at fifteen minute intervals. No word was received from the fort garrisons, so the rebels' plan would only work if they could embark before shore batteries came into action. However, a wireless operator tipped off the Portuguese Admiralty to the plan at around 01:00. A boat was immediately dispatched to survey the situation of the fleet.

Upon seeing the Admiralty launch, most of the Portuguese sailors realized their plot had been discovered and chose not to revolt. The sailors on Afonso attempted to lure the Admiralty officers aboard, but the launch fled and the crew opened fire with machine guns. It took almost an hour before the alarm was raised ashore. When the forts were finally alerted, they could not target the mutineers' ships due to a heavy mist. The rebels were hesitant to leave without further orders from their leaders, and did not attempt a breakout until daylight. The Portuguese naval minister ordered coastal artillery to fire on any vessel attempting to leave the harbour.

By then the mist had cleared and the shore batteries opened fire. Afonso responded but was soon struck. A loyal submarine opened fire on her with a machine gun. Afonsos bridge was destroyed in the engagement and her engines were crippled. Dão, caught in the cross-fire between two forts, was also hit and both ships ran aground. The crews raised white flags to signal their surrender. Government forces boarded Afonso and arrested its crew. In an attempt to conceal their actions, several sailors stripped off their uniforms and attempted to swim ashore. Loyal Portuguese troops raked them with machine gun fire. The rebels were rounded up near the Belém Tower and taken prisoner. The leader of the revolt, a sailor from Dão, committed suicide.

Aftermath
The Portuguese Navy Ministry reported that twelve sailors were killed and twenty wounded. 238 were arrested and deported to the Tarrafal concentration camp on Santiago, Portuguese Cape Verde. The Ministry dismissed both crews in their entirety, reinstating sailors only if they were able to prove they resisted the mutiny. An investigation was also opened into discipline aboard the aviso Bartolomeu Dias. 

According to historian Glyn Stone, the revolt was "easily suppressed and remained an isolated incident" and did not pose a threat to Salazar. The German Ambassador to Portugal, Oswald von Hoyningen-Huene, reported that "it is even said that Salazar...provoked the dramatic development, or at the very least allowed matters to run their usual course." The government framed the mutiny as a communist plot to surrender the Portuguese ships to the Spanish Republican Navy. On 9 September, Salazar issued an official statement which depicted the Spanish Civil War as an international conflict and warned of the dangers of political contagion. He appealed for the creation of a new armed force to counter such a threat. The next day he introduced a law forcing all public servants to swear allegiance to the principles of his regime. On 30 September, an anti-communist paramilitary force, the Legião Portuguesa, was formed. 

Communist activity in the Portuguese Armed Forces declined after the mutiny and remained minimal in the following years. Though it had dealt with the mutiny with force, the Portuguese government feared further revolts. Several days after the event the British press reported that several Portuguese Army units had rebelled, prompting the Portuguese embassy in London to issue a denial and declare the foreign press was depicting the Portuguese situation as chaotic to the Spanish government's benefit, and therefore the government was "obliged to intensify its offensive against communism". The mutiny ultimately strengthened Portuguese support for Franco's faction in the Spanish Civil War. In October the Portuguese government officially severed relations with the Spanish Republican government.

The mutiny forms of the backdrop for the 1984 novel The Year of the Death of Ricardo Reis by José Saramago.

Notes

References

Bibliography

External links
Revolta dos Marinheiros.

1936 in Portugal
Communism in Portugal
Conflicts in 1936
Estado Novo (Portugal)
Naval mutinies
Maritime incidents in 1936
Portuguese Navy
Spanish Civil War